is an elevated station on the Hanshin Electric Railway Main Line in Japan, with trains travelling east to Hanshin's terminal in  (Osaka), and west to central Kobe ( and ). At Motomachi, number of limited express trains carry on along the Sanyo Railway to Himeji city. This section of the track will be elevated, in keeping with the majority of the line.

Layout
The station has four tracks with two island platforms. 

On the days of the events at Hanshin Koshien Stadium, trains stand by at Line 1 and go to Koshien Station to be extra trains for Umeda.

Surroundings
Sunshine Wharf Kobe (サンシャインワーフ神戸)

History 
Ōgi Station opened on April 12, 1905 along with the rest of the Hanshin Main Line. 

On January 17, 1995, the station was damaged by the Great Hanshin earthquake. Service in the affected area was restored by June 26, 1995.

Station numbering was introduced on 21 December 2013, with Ōgi being designated as station number HS-22.

Between April 2009 and November 2019, the line between Sumiyoshi Station and Ashiya Station underwent grade separation. The elevated westbound tracks opened for service in December 2015 while the eastbound tracks opened for service on November 30, 2019.

Gallery

References

External links 
Station website (in Japanese)

Railway stations in Japan opened in 1905
Railway stations in Hyōgo Prefecture